Wayne Carroll (born 22 March 1958) is  a former Australian rules footballer who played with South Melbourne in the Victorian Football League (VFL). 		
		
Wayne “Christmas” Carroll started playing seniors with Ganmain in 1976 under legendary Riverina coach the late Greg Leech and played a key role in winning the club’s last-ever premiership as a stand-alone club in the South West Football League (New South Wales) .

He transferred to Queanbeyan in the ACT in 1977 and played in their premiership. He re-joined brother, “Jock” (Greg), at Mangoplah-Cookardinia United in 1978 then playing in the Farrer league, then went to South in 1980 after playing one senior VFL game on a permit in 1979.

Upon returning to the Riverina in 1986, “Christmas” took over as captain-coach of Turvey Park in Wagga and led the Bulldogs to four premierships in a row, 1987-1990.

“Christmas” represented NSW in 1979 under Alan Jeans and then again from 1986 to 1990.

He won the VFL Mark of the Year award in 1984.

Notes

External links 		
		
		
		
		
		
		
Living people		
1958 births		
		
Australian rules footballers from New South Wales		
Sydney Swans players
Queanbeyan Football Club players